Kawasumi (written: 川澄) is a Japanese surname. Notable people with the surname include:

, Japanese voice actress and singer
, Japanese sprinter
, Japanese footballer

Japanese-language surnames